The Ecker Flying Boat was an early American-built amphibious biplane.

Development
Herman Anthony Ecker of Syracuse, New York, designed and built a single-seat open-cockpit biplane in 1911. The following year, Ecker designed a two-seat open-cockpit biplane which he described at the time as a flying boat, although as it was fitted with wheels in the lower fuselage, it was technically an amphibian. The 1912 aircraft was based on the design of the Curtiss Owl and utilised an all-wooden construction with muslin covering on the fuselage and wings.

Operational history
Ecker flew the aircraft for three years before disassembling it for storage. It was reassembled in 1930 for exhibition at the New York State Fair. It was later acquired by the Smithsonian Institution as a static exhibit. After display at the Silver Hill, Maryland NASM restoration facility, it is currently exhibited at the National Air and Space Museum in central Washington DC.

Specifications (variant)

References
Notes

Bibliography

External links

 Information on the Ecker Flying Boat, Aerofiles.com
 Ecker Flying Boat, National Air and Space Museum

1910s United States civil utility aircraft
Aircraft first flown in 1912
Amphibious aircraft